Leslie Arthur Ramsay (July 1, 1919 – September 1, 1990) was a professional ice hockey player who played eleven games in the National Hockey League. He played with the Chicago Black Hawks. He was born in Verdun, Quebec.

References 

1919 births
1990 deaths
Canadian ice hockey left wingers
Chicago Blackhawks players
People from Verdun, Quebec
Ice hockey people from Montreal